Henri Louis La Fayette Villaume Ducoudray Holstein (born Heinrich Ludwig Villaume, on 23 September 1772 in Schwedt/Oder, Uckermark, Brandenburg, Prussia – died on 23 April 1839 in Albany, New York) was a soldier in France and Venezuela, and an author in the United States.

Biography
Decoudray Holstein was an officer in the French Army under Napoleon and was taken prisoner in Cádiz, Spain. In 1813 Ducoudray Holstein departed for Philadelphia, Pennsylvania but was denied entry in the U.S. Army. In 1814 he arrived at Cartagena de Indias, where he joined Simón Bolívar and was appointed officer in the army. With the grade of colonel he was an eye witness of the crucial revolutionary years 1814-1816.

In Cartagena he was first in the Corsairs of French privateer Louis Aury, with whom he maintained a friendship, and later at militia corps of General Manuel del Castillo y Rada es
, who just fought the royalists of Santa Marta during the liberation wars on the Río Magdalena. As in January 1815 entered a government crisis due to several coups in a short time with continued coups, he starred opposite del Castillo y Rada, which ended the political instability militarily. Here he married the neogranadine María del Carmen.

While general Pablo Morillo siege of Cartagena from late August to early December 1815, he served as General defending the fortress Boca Chica on the island of Tierra Bomba in the harbor entrance. The day before the surrender fled to Haiti with the Venezuelan officers of Bolivar on the ship of his friend, the naval commander of Cartagena, Louis Aury. He met the Liberator Simón Bolívar in January 1816 in Port Au Prince and joined him. Holstein took part in Les Cayes Expedition to liberate Venezuela from Spanish rule. Landing at Margarita island in May 1816 support the local establishment Bolivar as commander in chief. Despite the surprising taking of Carúpano by the vanguard of Bolivar, he saw clearly ahead of the forthcoming retreat of Ocumare de la Costa and left on June 23, the army of Bolivar. He embarked again to Haiti where disappointed with the womanizing and totalitarian behavior of Simón Bolívar "in his eyes" who has repeatedly fled during engagements against the Spanish enemy, Ducoudray Holstein resigned in 1816, left Bolívar army and moved to Aux Cayes, Haiti in order to get by there as a bookseller and music teacher.

His experience with Bolívar and with the independence wars in Venezuela are described in 

He later moved to the United States, settling in Albany, New York, where he became a language teacher and editor of The Zodiac.

Family
He married Maria del Carmen (c. 1800 Colombia - 1 May 1855 Albany, New York); they had son Lafayette Ducoudray Holstein (1 August 1826 New York - 7 April 1864).

Works
 Recollections of an Officer of the Empire

See also
Ducoudray Holstein Expedition

Notes

References

External links 
 Spanish version of Memoirs of Simon Bolivar, 

1772 births
1839 deaths
People from Schwedt
People from the Margraviate of Brandenburg
People of the Napoleonic Wars
People of the Spanish American wars of independence
German emigrants to the United States
American biographers
American male biographers
American male journalists